Good Cry is the debut extended play (EP) by American singer Noah Cyrus. It was released on September 21, 2018, and was preceded by the single "Mad at You", a collaboration with Gallant.

Singles
The first single from the EP, is "Mad At You" featuring the singer Gallant. The music video was released on November 12, 2018.

Critical reception
Good Cry was listed as the 19th best EP of 2018 by Idolator, with Mike Wass saying "The rising star's Good Cry EP showcases her soulful vocals and proves that she's capable of producing a cohesive collection of tracks."

Tour

The Good Cry Tour

On September 22, 2018, Cyrus embarked on The Good Cry Tour. The first show took place at the Revolution Live in Fort Lauderdale. The tour ended on October 24 at the Wonder Ballroom in Portland.

Track listing

Charts

References

2018 debut EPs
Noah Cyrus albums
EPs by American artists
Pop music EPs